The 2013 Men's NORCECA Volleyball Championship was the 23rd edition of the tournament, played from 23 to 28 September 2013 at The Langley Events Centre in Langley, Canada. The event served as qualifier for the 2013 FIVB Men's World Grand Champions Cup.

Pools composition

Squads

Pool standing procedure
 Number of matches won
 Match points
 Points ratio
 Sets ratio
 Result of the last match between the tied teams

Match won 3–0: 5 match points for the winner, 0 match points for the loser
Match won 3–1: 4 match points for the winner, 1 match point for the loser
Match won 3–2: 3 match points for the winner, 2 match points for the loser

Preliminary round
All times are Pacific Daylight Time (UTC−07:00).

Pool A

Pool B

Pool C

Final round
All times are Pacific Daylight Time (UTC−07:00).

7th–9th places

9th place match

7th place match

Championship

Quarterfinals

Semifinals

5th place match

3rd place match

Final

Final standing

Awards

Best players

Most Valuable Player
 Matthew Anderson
Best Scorer
 Rolando Cepeda
Best Spiker
 Andy Leonardo
Best Blocker
 Rudy Verhoeff
Best Server
 Micah Christenson
Best Digger
 Dennis del Valle
Best Setter
 Micah Christenson
Best Receiver
 Blair Bann
Best Libero
 Dennis del Valle
Jim Coleman Award
 John Speraw

All–star team

Best Setter
 Micah Christenson
Best Outside Spikers
 Matthew Anderson
 William Priddy
Best Middle Blockers
 Rudy Verhoeff
 Byron Ferguson
Best Opposite Spiker
 Daniel Vargas
Best Libero
 Dennis del Valle

References

External links
Official website
Regulations

Men's NORCECA Volleyball Championship
2013 in volleyball
International volleyball competitions hosted by Canada
Men's NORCECA
2013 in Canadian sports